NGC 2326 (also known as PGC 20218) is a barred spiral galaxy in the Lynx constellation. It was discovered by William Herschel on 9 February 1788. Its apparent magnitude is 14.3  and its size is 2.71 arc minutes. It is located near NGC 2326A.

References

Barred spiral galaxies
20218
2326
03681
Lynx (constellation)
18260906
Discoveries by William Herschel